Elymaic is a Unicode block containing characters for the Elymaic alphabet, used in the ancient state of Elymais.

History
The following Unicode-related documents record the purpose and process of defining specific characters in the Elymaic block:

References 

Unicode blocks